Best of Lara Fabian is the first compilation released by Lara Fabian. It debuted at #1 on the Belgium Wallonia chart.

The album focuses mainly on her French success, excluding her first album and previous singles. It includes all her charted singles except "I Am Who I Am", "Love By Grace", "Aimer déjà", "L'homme qui n'avait pas de maison" and "Soleil, soleil." In addition to her hit singles, the album features two new songs: the single "On s'aimerait tout bas" and a virtual duet with Ray Charles, "Ensemble."

The album is also available as a limited edition with a DVD of a Tout les femmes en moi special.

Track listing

Disc One

Disc Two

Weekly charts

Certifications

References

2010 compilation albums
Lara Fabian albums